Baba Lokenath Brahmachari was a Bengali spiritual master and yogi, considered to be one of the most influential gurus of eastern philosophy.

Early life
Baba Lokenath was born as Lokenath Ghoshal at Chaurasi Chakla (in present-day West Bengal) on Janmashtami day (the birthday of Lord Krishna) in 1730 in a Bengali Brahmin family to Ramnarayan Ghoshal (father) and Kamaladevi (mother). He was the fourth of their children. As was the convention of his times, his parents had reportedly pledged to send one of their sons to be a sannyasi. When he was 10, Loknath's father approached Pandit Bhagavan Ganguly, a local householder yogi, to be his son's teacher. Bhagavan Ganguly immediately forsee young Loknath's spiritual potential, and a divine trait of discipline present at a young age. Therefore, Bhagavan Ganguly agreed to take Lokenath as his disciple. Loknath left his parents and started his spiritual training with Bhagavan Ganguly shortly thereafter. Accompanying him on his spiritual expedition was his friend, Benimadhav.

Spiritual practice 
For the next three decades, Baba Loknath underwent intense training in various schools of Yoga in several remote locations all over the Indian subcontinent. He adopted a lifestyle of extreme austerity and vowed celibacy (hence brahmacārī) and undertook long periods of fasting. He finally attained Enlightenment in the Himalayas at the age of 90 in 1820. His guru was still alive and was 150 years old then. After enlightenment, he is said to have traveled all over South Asia and Southeast Asia on foot. Having transcended the narrow boundaries of faith and religion, he visited many religious shrines associated with Islam, Christianity, Judaism, Buddhism, Sikhism, and Jainism. This included three trips to Mecca and tours of modern-day Afghanistan, Iran, Israel, Palestine, and far regions of central Asia including the Middle East.

Return to Bengal
Baba Lokenath returned to Bengal in 1866 and settled down at Baradi, near Dhaka (present-day Bangladesh), where he built a small thatch out of mud and bamboo using his own hands. This would later grow to be his ashram for the rest of his life. The plot of land was donated by Dengu Karmakar, whom Baba had saved from a conviction in the past. Unlike many other sages and mystics of his times, Baba preferred to keep a low profile and avoided any kind of publicity. Nonetheless, he would help and heal anyone who visited him, irrespective of their caste, creed, or color. His fame inevitably spread far and wide, and the ashram at Baradi slowly started attracting devotees from all over the world.

Myths and legends
Not much is known about Baba Lokenath's personal life, which has always remained shrouded in mystery. Several folklores exist about his miraculous powers and magical abilities. He is said to have lived until 160 and remains one of the most prominent examples of the human longevity myth. Decades of sadhana in the High Himalayas had given him the ability to tolerate extremely cold temperatures without any warm clothing. In his later years, he is also said to have completely given up sleeping and would even not blink. Since he never turned anybody down, he was also known as the Wish tree.

Death and legacy
Baba went into a samadhi with his eyes wide open on 1 June 1890 (19 Joishtho 1297 BS). He was surrounded by his disciples at his Baradi Ashram. Comforting his mourning devotees shortly before his death, Baba promised to continue being available to anyone who prayed and asked for help, even after his death and forever. One of his famous quotes roughly transliterates as: "Whether it is at war, or in the woods, or on the water; if you are ever in danger, remember me, and I shall save you." In Bengali: "রণে বনে জলে জঙ্গলে, যখনই যেখানে বিপদে পড়িবে, আমাকে স্মরণ করিবে আমি তোমাদের রক্ষা করিব।"

Baba Lokenath's teachings continues to inspire spiritual people in India and abroad, well over a century after his death.

References

Further reading

External links
  
 Baba Lokenath 
 Baba Lokenath (1730-1890)

 
 

1730 births
1890 deaths
18th-century Bengalis
Bengali Hindus
Ascetics
Bengali Brahmins
Bengal Renaissance
Longevity myths
Indian Hindu yogis
Indian Hindu monks
Religious pluralism
Bengali Hindu saints
19th-century Hindu philosophers and theologians
People from Barasat